Nyrthos is an action RPG developed by BeerDeer Games, a Czech independent game development studio. The target platforms are Microsoft Windows, Macintosh, Android and iOS.

Gameplay
The game takes place in a fictional world, "Nyrthos", a continent surrounded by sea. Little is known about the actual storyline.

Nyrthos draws influence from the Diablo and Gothic series. The game's core mechanics will be similar to other RPGs (e.g. killing monsters, leveling, learning new skills, looting), however, Nyrthos will also borrow mechanics from other genres, such as giving the players the option to build structures and manage resources like a simulation video game.

The game takes place in an expanding world, in which players can influence the story development with their votes and actions. Nyrthos also features a day/night/weather cycle that strongly impacts the world. The night is dark and more dangerous, so many actions have to be performed during the day. The cycle influences many things, such as enemies, spawnable items, and events.

BeerDeer Games 
BeerDeer Games is a small indie games development studio located in Prague, Czech Republic. It was founded in 2011 by Martin Pivko and Martin Jelínek, who had previously worked together on several projects in the area of flash, game, application, and web development. Nyrthos is their first original project and was supposed to come out for PC, Android and iOS in 2012, but did not make the deadline.

Technology and Platforms 
The game is being developed using Stage3D and Starling and will be possibly both browser-based (using the flash plug-in) / installed. The target platforms are both browsers (PC, MAC) and mobiles (Android, iOS).

The use of Stage 3D/Flash allows to utilize devices' graphics cards, even while running in the flash plug-in, in order to lower the performance load of the processor.

External links 
 https://web.archive.org/web/20150626170125/https://game.nyrthos.com/ - running game free to play on Facebook 
 https://web.archive.org/web/20131211221117/http://www.nyrthos.com/            - official site

Upcoming video games
Action role-playing video games
Video games developed in the Czech Republic
IOS games
Android (operating system) games
Indie video games
Windows games
MacOS games
Early access video games